The 2022 Big Ten Men's Swimming and Diving Championships was held from February 23–26, 2022 at the Morgan J Burke Aquatic Center in West Lafayette, Indiana. It was the 113th annual  Big Ten-sanctioned swimming and diving championship meet.

Team standings
Full results

Swimming results 
Full results

Diving results

Awards
Big Ten Swimmer of the Championship:  Brendan Burns, Indiana

Big Ten Diver of the Championships: Andrew Capobianco, Indiana

Big Ten Freshman of the Year: Alex Quach, Ohio State

All-Big Ten Teams
The following swimmers were selected to the All Big-Ten Teams:

Big Ten Sportsmanship Award Honorees

References

BIG 10 Men's Swimming and Diving Championships
2022 BIG 10 Men's Swimming and Diving Championships